Nadezhdinsky is a rural locality (a khutor) in Ivano-Kuvalatsky Selsoviet, Zilairsky District, Bashkortostan, Russia. The population was 140 as of 2010. There are 3 streets.

Geography 
Nadezhdinsky is located 67 km north of Zilair (the district's administrative centre) by road. Shulka is the nearest rural locality.

References 

Rural localities in Zilairsky District